Cleveland is a suburb of Johannesburg, South Africa. Its now a light industrial suburb. It is located in Region F of the City of Johannesburg Metropolitan Municipality.

History
The suburb is situated on part of an old Witwatersrand farm called Doornfontein. It was established in 1903 and was named after Cleveland, Ohio and the suburb was the location for storage of mining equipment by American firms.

References

Johannesburg Region F